Sound on Sound is the sixth album to be released by Saturday Looks Good to Me.  The record serves as a collection of difficult to find tracks and rarities released by the band from its formation in 2000 through to 2005. The tracks are listed in chronological order.

Track listing

References

2006 albums
Saturday Looks Good to Me albums